The 2007 floor crossing window period in South Africa was a period of 15 days, from 1 to 15 September 2007, in which members of the National Assembly and the provincial legislatures, and municipal councils were able to cross the floor from one political party to another without giving up their seats. The period was authorised by the Tenth Amendment of the Constitution of South Africa, which scheduled regular window periods in the second and fourth September after each election. The previous general election had been held on 14 April 2004, and a previous window period had occurred in September 2005.

In the National Assembly and the provincial legislatures, the changes were minor, with the most significant development being the creation of the African People's Convention by departing members of the Pan Africanist Congress.

The tables below show all the changes; in those provinces not listed there was no change in the provincial legislature.

Tables

National Assembly

|-style="background:#e9e9e9;"
!colspan="2" style="text-align:left"|Party
!Seats before
!Net change
!Seats after
|-
|
|293
| +4
|297
|-
|
|47
| 0
|47
|-
|
|23
| 0
|23
|-
|
|6
| 0
|6
|-
|
|5
| −1
|4
|-
|
|4
| 0
|4
|-
|
|4
| 0
|4
|-
|bgcolor="#eeeeee"|
|style="text-align:left"|National Democratic Convention
|4
| 0
|4
|-
|
|3
| 0
|3
|-
|
|2
| 0
|2
|-
|
|
| +2
|2
|-
|
|3
| −2
|1
|-
|
|1
| 0
|1
|-
|bgcolor="#eeeeee"|
|style="text-align:left"|Federation of Democrats
|1
| 0
|1
|-
|bgcolor="#eeeeee"|
|style="text-align:left"|National Alliance
|
| +1
|1
|-
|
|2
| −2
|0
|-
|bgcolor="#eeeeee"|
|style="text-align:left"|Progressive Independent Movement
|1
| −1
|0
|-
|bgcolor="#eeeeee"|
|style="text-align:left"|United Party
|1
| −1
|0
|-style="background:#e9e9e9;"
!colspan="2" style="text-align:left"|Total
!colspan="3" style="text-align:center"|400
|}

Eastern Cape Provincial Legislature

|-style="background:#e9e9e9;"
!colspan="2" style="text-align:left"|Party
!Seats before
!Net change
!Seats after
|-
|
|51
| +2
|53
|-
|
|5
| 0
|5
|-
|
|4
| 0
|4
|-
|
|
| +1
|1
|-
|
|2
| −2
|0
|-
|
|1
| −1
|0
|-style="background:#e9e9e9;"
!colspan="2" style="text-align:left"|Total
!colspan="3" style="text-align:center"|63
|}

Gauteng Provincial Legislature

|-style="background:#e9e9e9;"
!colspan="2" style="text-align:left"|Party
!Seats before
!Net change
!Seats after
|-
|
|51
| 0
|51
|-
|
|12
| +1
|13
|-
|
|2
| 0
|2
|-
|
|1
| +1
|2
|-
|
|1
| +1
|2
|-
|
|1
| 0
|1
|-
|bgcolor="#eeeeee"|
|style="text-align:left"|Alliance of Free Democrats
|1
| 0
|1
|-
|
|
| +1
|1
|-
|bgcolor="#eeeeee"|
|style="text-align:left"|Federal Alliance
|2
| −2
|0
|-
|
|1
| −1
|0
|-
|
|1
| −1
|0
|-style="background:#e9e9e9;"
!colspan="2" style="text-align:left"|Total
!colspan="3" style="text-align:center"|73
|}

KwaZulu-Natal Provincial Legislature

|-style="background:#e9e9e9;"
!colspan="2" style="text-align:left"|Party
!Seats before
!Net change
!Seats after
|-
|
|40
| +1
|41
|-
|
|27
| 0
|27
|-
|
|5
| 0
|5
|-
|bgcolor="#eeeeee"|
|style="text-align:left"|National Democratic Convention
|4
| −1
|3
|-
|
|2
| 0
|2
|-
|
|1
| 0
|1
|-
|
|1
| 0
|1
|-style="background:#e9e9e9;"
!colspan="2" style="text-align:left"|Total
!colspan="3" style="text-align:center"|80
|}

Limpopo Provincial Legislature

|-style="background:#e9e9e9;"
!colspan="2" style="text-align:left"|Party
!Seats before
!Net change
!Seats after
|-
|
|45
| +1
|46
|-
|
|2
| −1
|1
|-
|
|1
| 0
|1
|-
|
|1
| 0
|1
|-style="background:#e9e9e9;"
!colspan="2" style="text-align:left"|Total
!colspan="3" style="text-align:center"|49
|}

Northern Cape Provincial Legislature

|-style="background:#e9e9e9;"
!colspan="2" style="text-align:left"|Party
!Seats before
!Net change
!Seats after
|-
|
|24
| +1
|25
|-
|
|3
| −1
|2
|-
|
|1
| 0
|1
|-
|
|1
| 0
|1
|-
|
|1
| 0
|1
|-style="background:#e9e9e9;"
!colspan="2" style="text-align:left"|Total
!colspan="3" style="text-align:center"|30
|}

Western Cape Provincial Parliament

|-style="background:#e9e9e9;"
!colspan="2" style="text-align:left"|Party
!Seats before
!Net change
!Seats after
|-
|
|24
| +3
|27
|-
|
|13
| −2
|11
|-
|
|2
| 0
|2
|-
|
|2
| −1
|1
|-
|
|1
| 0
|1
|-style="background:#e9e9e9;"
!colspan="2" style="text-align:left"|Total
!colspan="3" style="text-align:center"|42
|}

National Council of Provinces
The National Council of Provinces was reconstituted as a result of the changes in the provincial legislatures. Its reconstituted makeup was as follows:

|-style="background:#e9e9e9;"
!colspan="2" style="text-align:left"|Party
!style="text-align:left"|Delegate type
!EC
!FS
!G
!KZN
!L
!M
!NW
!NC
!WC
!colspan=2|Total
|-
| style="width: 4px" bgcolor= rowspan=2|
| style="text-align: left;" scope="row" rowspan=2 | 
|style="text-align:left"|Permanent
|4
|4
|4
|3
|5
|5
|4
|4
|3
|36
|rowspan=2|68
|-
|style="text-align:left"|Special
|4
|4
|3
|2
|4
|4
|4
|4
|3
|32
|-
| style="width: 4px" bgcolor= rowspan=2|
| style="text-align: left;" scope="row" rowspan=2 | 
|style="text-align:left"|Permanent
|1
|1
|1
|1
|1
|1
|1
|1
|2
|10
|rowspan=2|12
|-
|style="text-align:left"|Special
|
|
|1
|
|
|
|
|
|1
|2
|-
| style="width: 4px" bgcolor= rowspan=2|
| style="text-align: left;" scope="row" rowspan=2 | 
|style="text-align:left"|Permanent
|
|
|1
|2
|
|
|
|
|
|3
|rowspan=2|4
|-
|style="text-align:left"|Special
|
|
|
|1
|
|
|
|
|
|1
|-
|
|style="text-align:left"|Permanent
|
|
|
|
|
|
|
|
|1
|colspan=2|1
|-
|
|style="text-align:left"|Permanent
|
|
|
|
|
|
|
|1
|
|colspan=2|1
|-
|
|style="text-align:left"|Permanent
|
|1
|
|
|
|
|
|
|
|colspan=2|1
|-
|
|style="text-align:left"|Permanent
|
|
|
|
|
|
|1
|
|
|colspan=2|1
|-
|
|style="text-align:left"|Permanent
|1
|
|
|
|
|
|
|
|
|colspan=2|1
|-
|bgcolor="#eeeeee"|
|style="text-align:left"|National Democratic Convention
|style="text-align:left"|Special
|
|
|
|1
|
|
|
|
|
|colspan=2|1
|-style="background:#e9e9e9;"
!colspan="3" style="text-align:left"|Total
!10
!10
!10
!10
!10
!10
!10
!10
!10
!colspan=2|90
|}

Notes to the tables

National floor crossings

From PAC to APC
Themba Godi
Mofihli Likotsi

Provincial floor crossings

Eastern Cape

From PAC to APC
Zingisa Mkhabile

Western Cape

From UIF to DA
Elizabeth Thompson (politician)

From DA to ANC
Kent Morkel
Kobus Brynard

Gauteng

From PAC to APC
Malesela Ledwaba

Municipal floor crossings

City of Cape Town

From DA to NPP
David Sasman

See also
 Floor crossing (South Africa)
 2003 South African floor-crossing window period
 2005 South African floor-crossing window period

References

Political history of South Africa
2007 in South Africa